Jack Cunningham, Baron Cunningham of Felling (born 1939) is a British Labour Party politician.

Jack Cunningham may also refer to:

Jack Cunningham (screenwriter) (1882–1941), American screenwriter
Jack Armand Cunningham (1890–1956), English World War I flying ace
Jack Cunningham (rower) (1912–1975), Canadian Olympic rower
Jack Cunningham (bishop) (1926–1978), Anglican bishop of Central Zambia
Jack Cunningham (footballer) (born 1940), Australian rules footballer

See also
John Cunningham (disambiguation)